Lastreopsis marginans, known as the glossy or bordered shield fern is a fern found in eastern Australia. The habitat is rainforest or wet sclerophyll forest. Fronds are crowded and erect, between 50 and 90 cm long, coloured a glossy dark green. The lectotype was collected near the Clarence River by Hermann Beckler.

References

Dryopteridaceae
Flora of New South Wales
Flora of Queensland
Plants described in 1866